De Wet Barry (born 24 June 1978 in Ceres, Western Cape) is a South African former rugby union footballer who played 38 test matches for the South Africa (the Springboks).

In 2000, Barry made his Springbok debut against Canada in East London. Barry had a reputation as a brutal defender and hard, straight running centre, this saw him become a key member of the Springbok squad in 2004. Barry captained the Stormers in the 2006 Super 14 season. Following the 2007 Currie Cup, Barry joined Harlequin F.C. of the Premiership Rugby. In July 2009 he signed up to join  in the Currie Cup.

In January 2012, Barry announced his retirement. However, he left at the end of 2013.

Achievements
 SANZAR u21 Championship with South Africa Under-21 1999.
 Currie Cup 2000 & 2001 with Western Province.
 Tri Nations 2004, with South Africa.

References

1978 births
Living people
People from Ceres, Western Cape
South African rugby union players
South Africa international rugby union players
South African people of Afrikaner descent
South African people of British descent
Stormers players
Western Province (rugby union) players
Rugby union centres
Harlequin F.C. players
Alumni of Paarl Gimnasium
Eastern Province Elephants players
Rugby union players from the Western Cape